Hipparchia blachieri is a butterfly of the family Nymphalidae. It was described by Hans Fruhstorfer in 1908. It is endemic to Sicily and Malta.

The wingspan is 58–65 mm.

Taxonomy
The species is often treated as a subspecies of Hipparchia neapolitana.

References

Butterflies described in 1908
Hipparchia (butterfly)